General elections were held in Saint Vincent and the Grenadines on 5 November 2020. Nomination day was 20 October 2020. The result was a victory for the Unity Labour Party, its fifth in a row; the party won nine of the fifteen seats, gaining one seat. These elections marked the first time since 1998 that the party which received the most votes did not win the most seats and the first time since 1994 that the New Democratic Party won the popular vote.

Electoral system
The 15 elected members of the House of Assembly are elected in single-member constituencies using the first-past-the-post system. A further six members are appointed: four by the government and two by the opposition.

As the previous elections had been held in 2015, the current elections were constitutionally required to be held by March 2021.  While the previous three elections had been held in December, PM Ralph Gonsalves chose to hold this election in November.

Background
Several minor parties decided not to contest the elections. The SVG Party and the United Progressive Party both ended their campaigns before Nomination Day. The leader of the Democratic Republican Party, Anesia Baptiste, announced her resignation on 9 October; she also stated that the party would not participate in the upcoming elections.

Contesting parties

Unity Labour Party 
The ULP campaigned for a record fifth term in power, with PM Gonsalves dubbing himself the "5-Star General".  Gonsalves pointed to the Argyle International Airport and the Canouan Airport as examples of the party's record in improving infrastructure.  He criticized the NDP for supporting Citizenship by investment (CBI), and later alleged that foreign strategists were directing the NDP campaign and spying on the ULP.  In contrast to the "foreign influences" of the NDP, Gonsalves emphasized that the ULP's party manifesto had "come from the bowels of the people of this country".  He explained that new foreign investments in hotels and airports would allow the SVG to remain the sole country in the Organisation of Eastern Caribbean States without a CBI program.

Gonsalves' son Camillo, the incumbent East St. George MP, criticized the NDP for nominating a returning emigrant like Fitzgerald Bramble, rather than someone who had been living in the country more recently.

New Democratic Party 
After leading the NDP in the four previous elections, former PM Arnhim Eustace stepped down as party president in 2016, and retired from the Assembly in 2020.

The new leader Godwin Friday criticized the ULP's cronyism and its inability to improve the country over its 19 years in power: while the ULP leaders benefited from government projects, the average citizen faced rising costs-of-living and an unemployment rate of over 30 percent.  This situation led many young Vincentians to emigrate, further handicapping development.  To combat this, Friday proposed several incentives, such as decreasing the national VAT rate and the interest rate on student loans and reforming the port customs system.  He also proposed an increase in the minimum stipend for workers in the national service.

While the NDP had been advocating for the country to switch recognition from Taiwan to China since 2016, the party moderated its stance after meeting with Vincentians currently studying in Taiwan on scholarship.  Instead, the party indicated that it would maintain ties with Taiwan in return for increased investment in SVG.

Shevern John, the NDP candidate for North Windward, was denied leave from her job as a schoolteacher in order to contest the election, a benefit specified in the collective bargaining agreement between the SVG Teacher's Union (SVGTU) and the Public Service Commission (PSC).  She was forced to resign instead.  In 2010, three teachers wanting to run as NDP candidates had also been forced to resign; the SVGTU obtained a court decision in the teachers' favour, but the PSC had not reinstated the teachers as of 2020.

SVG Green Party 
In its statements, the GP criticized both the ULP and the NDP for their overreliance on the tourism industry.  The party promised free university education and wireless internet for all citizens.  In addition, the GP proposed Green economy initiatives in order to encourage more-sustainable economic growth and provide better jobs for the local population.  The initial funding for these initiatives would come from abolishing loopholes such as the "Mustique Act", which granted the (mostly foreign) residents of Mustique exemptions from tax and customs duties. Being smaller than the other two parties, the GP signalled support for joining a coalition government.

Candidates
33 candidates were nominated in total: 15 each from the ULP and the NDP, 2 from the Saint Vincent and the Grenadines Green Party, and one ULP member running as an independent in South Leeward.

Marginal seats

Results
For the first time since 1998, the ULP did not win the popular vote. However, the ULP saw their majority increase by one seat, North Leeward, which the ULP won by 7 votes. All other seats remained in the hands of the party previously holding them.  The NDP candidate for North Leeward, Roland "Patel" Matthews, requested a recount.  Some ballots from both sides were rejected in the recount; the final tally showed the ULP winning by 1 vote.

The National Monitoring and Consultative Mechanism (NMCM), a domestic election observer, judged the election to be free and fair overall. This was corroborated by a CARICOM observer mission.

Gonsalves was sworn in for his fifth term on 7 November, with Montgomery Daniel sworn in as Deputy Prime Minister.  The Governor-General, Susan Dougan, congratulated Gonsalves on his record win; she then reminded him to "create a structure for healing" society after the election, reaching out to opposition supporters as well as his own.

References

Saint Vincent
General election
Elections in Saint Vincent and the Grenadines
Saint Vincent